Nikola Petković (born 28 March 1986) is a Serbian former professional footballer who played as a centre-back.

Club career
Petković began his career with FK Vojvodina with which he played excellently in the 2006–07 Serbian SuperLiga season. Foreign clubs became interested in his services and he subsequently signed for Gençlerbirliği S.K., where he got less playing time and was loaned to two different clubs. In the summer of 2009, he signed with Eintracht Frankfurt, but again only managed to play on an infrequent basis and was loaned out to FC Tom Tomsk and Al-Ahli (Jeddah) before coming to sign for Red Star Belgrade in 2011.

Red Star Belgrade
Petković signed a two-year contract with Red Star Belgrade on the last day of the summer 2011 transfer window.

Sydney FC
On 19 September 2013, Sydney FC announced that they had completed their squad for the 2013/14 season by signing Petković on a one-year deal. After completing the move, Sydney FC manager Frank Farina stated: "I am expecting big things from him this season and believe he will have a big influence on the squad." Petković made his debut for Sydney FC on 11 October 2013 at home to Newcastle Jets where Sydney FC won 2–0.

On 8 October 2014, Petković, along with teammate Saša Ognenovski were appointed Sydney FC's vice-captains for the 2014–15 A-League season.

K.V.C. Westerlo
On 24 June, Petković signed with K.V.C. Westerlo due to homesickness. Despite being contracted until 2017, Petkovic terminated his contract in January 2016 for personal reasons.

Yanbian Fude 
On 26 January 2016, Petković transferred to Yanbian Funde in the Chinese Super League. He extended his contract with Yanbian on 10 February 2017.

Career statistics

Honours

Club
Al Ahli Saudi
 Kings Cup: 2010–11

Red Star
 Serbian Cup: 2011–12

Individual
 Sydney FC Player of the Year: 2013–14

References

External links
 
 Nikola Petković at tff.org
 Nikola Petković at worldsoccerstats

1986 births
Living people
Footballers from Belgrade
Serbian footballers
Serbian expatriate footballers
Serbia under-21 international footballers
Association football defenders
Serbian SuperLiga players
Süper Lig players
Bundesliga players
2. Bundesliga players
Russian Premier League players
Israeli Premier League players
China League One players
Chinese Super League players
Nikola Petkovic
Belgian Pro League players
FK Radnički Pirot players
FK Vojvodina players
Gençlerbirliği S.K. footballers
Red Star Belgrade footballers
Eintracht Frankfurt players
FC Tom Tomsk players
Al-Ahli Saudi FC players
Hapoel Tel Aviv F.C. players
Sydney FC players
K.V.C. Westerlo players
Nikola Petkovic
Yanbian Funde F.C. players
Sichuan Longfor F.C. players
FK Zemun players
Serbian expatriate sportspeople in Turkey
Serbian expatriate sportspeople in Germany
Serbian expatriate sportspeople in Russia
Serbian expatriate sportspeople in Israel
Serbian expatriate sportspeople in China
Serbian expatriate sportspeople in Belgium
Serbian expatriate sportspeople in Australia
Serbian expatriate sportspeople in Saudi Arabia
Serbian expatriate sportspeople in Thailand
Expatriate footballers in Turkey
Expatriate footballers in Germany
Expatriate footballers in Russia
Expatriate footballers in Israel
Expatriate footballers in China
Expatriate footballers in Belgium
Expatriate soccer players in Australia
Expatriate footballers in Saudi Arabia
Expatriate footballers in Thailand
Saudi Professional League players
A-League Men players